Patrick Duffy (born 1949) is an American television actor, best known for the role of Bobby Ewing on Dallas.

Patrick Duffy may also refer to:

Politicians
 Paddy Duffy (politician) (1938–1996), Irish nationalist politician
 Patrick Duffy (Irish politician) (1875–1946), Irish Cumann na nGaedhael politician
 Patrick Duffy (British politician) (born 1920), former British Member of Parliament

Sports
 Paddy Duffy (1864–1890), Irish-American boxer
 Patrick Duffy (fencer) (1921–1987), Irish Olympic fencer
 Pat Duffy (born 1975), American professional skateboarder

Others
 Patrick Duffy (bishop) (died 1675), 17th century Bishop of Clogher
 Patrick Vincent Duffy (1832–1909), Irish landscape painter, keeper of RHA
 Patrick Duffy (murder victim) (1933–1973), IRA murder victim
 Patrick Michael Duffy (born 1943), U.S. federal judge